The 2020 OKC Energy FC season is the club's seventh season of existence, and their seventh consecutive season in the USL Championship, the second tier of American soccer. Energy FC will also take part in the U.S. Open Cup. The season covers the period from October 19, 2019 to the beginning of the 2021 USLC season. The 2020 season was the first for OKC under new head coach John Pascarella, who had previously been the assistant coach at Minnesota United FC. Pascarella became just the third head coach in club history; Steve Cooke had been in charge for the previous two seasons.

Roster

Non-competitive

Preseason

Competitions

USL

Standings

Results summary

Results by round

Match results

U.S. Open Cup

Statistics

Appearances and goals

Disciplinary record

Clean sheets

Transfers

In

Out

See also
 OKC Energy FC
 2020 in American soccer
 2020 USL Championship season

References

OKC Energy
OKC Energy
OKC Energy
OKC Energy FC seasons